Alpha 6 may refer to:

 Alpha 6 (device), a device claimed to detect explosives and drugs
 Alpha 6 (Robert Silverberg anthology), a science fiction anthology edited by Robert Silverberg, first published in 1976
 Alpha 6 (Power Rangers), a Power Rangers character
 COL4A6, a human gene
 Integrin alpha 6, a human protein
 Ceti Alpha VI, a fictional planet mentioned in Star Trek II: The Wrath of Khan